The 2020 Thomas Cup qualification process is a series of tournaments organised by the five BWF confederations to decide 14 of the 16 teams which will play in the 2020 Thomas Cup, with Denmark qualifying automatically as hosts, and China qualifying automatically as trophy holder.

Qualified teams

Qualification process 
The number of teams participating in the final tournament is 16. The allocation of slots for each confederation is the same allocation from 2016 tournament; 4 from each Asia and Europe, and 1 from each Africa, Oceania and Pan Am. Two automatic qualifiers are the host and defending champion. The remaining quota will be filled by World Team Ranking.

Confederation qualification

Badminton Confederation of Africa

The qualification for the African teams was held from 10 to 13 February 2020, at the Cairo Stadium Indoor Halls Complex in Cairo, Egypt. The winners of the African qualification will qualified for the Thomas Cup.

Teams in contention
Teams qualified for the Group stage

First round (group stage)

Second round (knockout stage)

Badminton Asia

The qualification for the Asian teams will held from 11 to 16 February 2020, at the Srizal Memorial Coliseum in Manila, Philippines. The semifinalist of the Asian qualification will qualified for the Thomas Cup. China qualified automatically as trophy holder.

Teams in contention 
Teams qualified for the Group stage

First round (group stage)

Second round (knockout stage)

Badminton Europe 

The qualification for the European teams will held from 11 to 16 February 2020, at the Stade Couvert Régional in Liévin, France. The semi-finalist of the European qualification will qualified for the Thomas Cup. Denmark qualified automatically as hosts.

Teams in contention 
Teams qualified for the Group stage

 (qualified)

First round (group stage)

Second round (knockout stage)

Badminton Oceania 

The qualification for the Oceanian teams will hold from 13 to 15 February 2020, at the Ken Kay Badminton Stadium in Ballarat, Australia. The winner of the Oceania qualification qualified for the Thomas Cup.

Teams in contention

Round-robin

Badminton Pan Am 

The qualification for the Pan Am teams will hold from 13 to 16 February 2020, at the Centro Pan-Americano de Judô in Salvador, Bahia, Brazil. The winner of the Pan Am qualification will qualified for the Thomas Cup.

Teams in contention 
Teams qualified for the Group stage

First round (group stage)

Second round (knockout stage)

World team rankings

Summary of qualification 
Below is the chart of the BWF World Team Ranking calculated by adding World Ranking points of top three Men's Singles players and top two Men's Doubles pairs on 18 February 2020.

References 

Qualification